The Solar System and Back (1970) is a collection of science essays by American writer and scientist Isaac Asimov. It is the seventh in a series of books reprinting essays from The Magazine of Fantasy & Science Fiction.

Contents
 "Nothing" (March 1959)
 "The First Metal" (December 1967)
 "The Seventh Metal" (January 1968)
 "The Predicted Metal" (February 1968)
 "The Seventh Planet" (March 1968)
 "The Dance of the Sun" (April 1968)
 "Backward, Turn Backward—" (May 1968)
 "Counting Chromosomes" (June 1968)
 "Little Lost Satellite" (July 1968)
 "The Terrible Lizards" (August 1968)
 "The Dying Lizards" (September 1968)
 "Little Found Satellite" (October 1968)
 "The Planetary Eccentric" (November 1968)
 "View from Amalthea" (December 1968)
 "The Dance of the Satellites" (January 1969)
 "Uncertain, Coy, and Hard to Please" (February 1969)
 "Just Right" (March 1969)
 "The Incredible Shrinking People" (April 1969)

External links
Asimovonline.com

Essay collections by Isaac Asimov
1970 books
Works originally published in The Magazine of Fantasy & Science Fiction
Doubleday (publisher) books